Nauclea is a genus of flowering plants in the family Rubiaceae. The species are evergreen trees or shrubs that are native to the paleotropics. The terminal vegetative buds are usually strongly flattened. The generic name is derived from the Ancient Greek words naus, meaning "ship" and kleio, meaning "to close". It refers to the resemblance of the cells of the capsule to a ship's hull.

Cultivation and use
Nauclea diderrichii is a large tree from West Africa that is widely cultivated elsewhere. Its wood is resistant to borers and is used around harbors and in other places where wood is in constant contact with water.

Taxonomy
Nauclea is a member of the tribe Naucleeae and is sister to a clade consisting of Burttdavya and Sarcocephalus. The current type species for the genus is Nauclea orientalis. Linnaeus originally named it Cephalanthus orientalis in the first edition of Species Plantarum but transferred it to Nauclea when he erected that genus in the second edition in 1762.

Species

Nauclea diderrichii (De Wild.) Merr.
 Nauclea gageana (King)
Nauclea gilletii (De Wild.) Merr.
Nauclea latifolia Smith
Nauclea officinalis (Pierre ex Pit.) Merr. & Chun
Nauclea orientalis (L.) L. - Common names: Kanluang, Bangkal, Leichhardt Tree, Cheesewood, Yellow Cheesewood, Canary Cheesewood
Nauclea parva (Havil.) Merr.
Nauclea robinsonii Merr.
Nauclea subdita (Korth.) Steud. - Common names: Bongkol, Bulubangkal
Nauclea tenuiflora (Havil.) Merr.
Nauclea vanderguchtii (De Wild.) E.M.A.Petit
Nauclea xanthoxylon (A.Chev.) Aubrév.

References

External links
World Checklist of Rubiaceae

Flora of West Tropical Africa
Flora of West-Central Tropical Africa
Trees of Africa
 
Rubiaceae genera